These are the results (the medal winners) of the diving competition at the 1991 World Aquatics Championships, which took place in Perth, Western Australia.

Medal table

Medal summary

Men

Women

 
1991 World Aquatics Championships
Diving at the World Aquatics Championships